The Hassan II Golf Trophy is a golf tournament in Morocco hosted by Prince Moulay Rachid. The tournament was founded by, and is now named for, his father, Hassan II, who served as King of Morocco. The tournament was originally staged as an invitational pro-am and attended by only a handful of top professionals. The winner receives a gold dagger inlaid with jewels.

It has been held at the Robert Trent Jones designed Royal Golf Dar Es Salam in Rabat every year except for 2011 through 2015, when it moved to Golf du Palais Royal in Agadir. The tournament has been played since 1971, but did not take place from 1986 to 1990, 2004, and 2009. It has been a European Tour event since 2010.

In November 2021, it was announced that the 2022 event would feature on the PGA Tour Champions schedule.

Winners

See also
Lalla Meryem Cup

Notes

References

External links
 
Coverage on the European Tour's official site

Former European Tour events
Golf tournaments in Morocco
Sport in Rabat
Sport in Agadir
Recurring sporting events established in 1971
1971 establishments in Morocco
Spring (season) events in Morocco